"Catch Me" is a song written by Sid Tepper and Roy C. Bennett and was first recorded in 1960 by American teenage singer Jeri Lynne Fraser and released as the B-side of her single "Poor Begonia (Caught Pneumonia)" in August 1960.

Cliff Richard and the Shadows version

Recording and release 
In September 1960, Cliff Richard and the Shadows recorded a version of "Catch Me" for Richard's album 21 Today, released in October 1961. Writers Tepper and Bennet also wrote the group's single "The Young Ones" and went on to write a total of 21 songs for Richard. Cliff Richard and the Shadows also recorded a cover of another song originally by Fraser, "Lessons in Love" in August 1961 for their album The Young Ones.

"Catch Me" was first released as a single in the US and Canada in January 1961 under the title "Catch Me, I'm Falling". The B-side was "'D' in Love", which was the B-side of the group previous single "I Love You". The following year, "Catch Me" was released as a single in Australia in April 1962 with the B-side "Tough Enough", written by Johnny Otis and Morris Riden and first released by Otis as a single in 1957. An EP titled Forty Days was released in the UK in March 1962 which included "Catch Me" and "Tough Enough" as well as two other songs from 21 Today: a cover of Chuck Berry's "Thirty Days", titled "Forty Days", and "How Wonderful to Know", a cover of the Italian song "Anema e core".

Track listing
7": ABC-Paramount / 45-10175 (US)

 "Catch Me, I'm Falling" – 2:27
 "'D' in Love" – 2:24

7": Columbia / DO-4274 (Australia)
 "Catch Me" – 2:22
 "Tough Enough" – 2:09

Personnel
 Cliff Richard – vocals
 Hank Marvin – lead guitar
 Bruce Welch – rhythm guitar
 Jet Harris – bass guitar
 Tony Meehan – drums

Charts

References

Cliff Richard songs
1962 singles
Songs written by Roy C. Bennett
Songs written by Sid Tepper
Columbia Graphophone Company singles
Song recordings produced by Norrie Paramor
1960 songs